Gafla is a 2006 Indian Hindi-language crime drama film directed by Sameer Hanchate. It is a film inspired from the stock market scam of 1992 which mainly involved Harshad Mehta that rocked the Indian economy and changed lives of thousands forever.

The film was nominated for many awards and won third Cyprus International Film Festival, 2008, 'Aphrodite Medallion' for 'Best Script' (Sameer Hanchate, Rajiv Velicheti, Bijesh Jayarajan), RACE - V. Shantaram Awards 2007 -Best Debut Director (Sameer Hanchate). It was selected for The Times BFI 50th London Film Festival 2006.

Synopsis
An ordinary young man, Subodh, starts out as like any middle-class guy, with limited opportunities to survive and get ahead. It is Subodh's journey into the stock markets and beyond through the eyes of different people in his personal and professional life. The film follows a story about big dreams. An adventure that starts with ambitious intentions but gets caught up in a crime-web.

Cast 
 Vinod Sharawat as Subodh Mehta
 Shruti Ulfat as Vidya
 Purva Parag as Maya
 Vikram Gokhale as Bhejnani
 Brijendra Kala as Hari
 Shakti Singh as Thakur
 Gyan Prakash as Jugaad Singh
 Pramatesh Mehta as Banker Wadhwani
 Saurabh Dubey
 Aditya Lakhia as Jayant
 Mangal Kenkre
 Sameer Hanchate as Aakash Parekh

Production
This film was produced and presented by Sameer Hanchate's Metropolis Multimedia Company.

Reception
The film's reviews were mostly mixed. It holds a 58% "rotten" rating on Rotten Tomatoes based on 135 reviews.

The Times of India rated the film 2 out of 5 stars. Taran Adarsh of Bollywood Hungama rated it 1.5 out of 5 stars.

References

External links
 
 

2006 films
2000s Hindi-language films
Indian films based on actual events
Indian crime drama films
2006 crime drama films